Mamadou Lamarana Diallo may refer to:
Mamadou Lamarana Diallo (born 1985), Guinean footballer for Persatu Tuban
Mamadou Lamarana Diallo (born 1994), Senegalese footballer for Grenoble